The 21st Guards Motor Rifle Brigade is a formation of the Russian Ground Forces based in Orenburg Oblast. It was formed on 1 June 2009 from the 27th Guards Motor Rifle Division as a result of the 2008 Russian military reform.

In 2014, the brigade was involved in the Russian military intervention in Ukraine.

History 
In August 2014 the brigade's units fought in the Battle of Ilovaisk. On 29 August, during a Ukrainian breakthrough attempt from Ilovaisk, a "northern" column of Ukrainian forces took the fight with 21st brigade's troops on a road between Voznesenka and Horbatenko villages. A Ukrainian T-64 tank and several BMP-2s of 51st Mechanized Brigade were able to destroy two T-72BA tanks and a BMP-2 of the 21st Motor Rifle Brigade. Another 21st brigade's T-72BA tank was destroyed near Kumachove village, presumably by a Tochka-U missile strike of the 19th Missile Brigade.

A Ukrainian Headquarters briefing held on 11 March 2015 noted the 21st Motor Rifle Brigade units are operating near Yenakiieve, Ukraine.

Bodies of soldiers, reportedly from the division, which were killed in the 2022 Russian invasion of Ukraine near  were among six that were to be swapped for two captured Ukrainian soldiers in an exchange in March 2022.

References 

Mechanised infantry brigades of Russia
Military units and formations established in 2009
Military units and formations of Russia in the war in Donbas